North Carolina Highway 142 (NC 142) is a primary state highway in the U.S. state of North Carolina that goes through the town of Hassell. The entire route is two lanes wide.

Route description
The western terminus of the highway is NC 111. Traveling east , the highway beings a brief  concurrency with NC 42 and joins the Tar Heel Trace scenic byway. NC 42 departs the route at the NC 11 intersection, NC 142 continues  to the rural community of Hassell. Leaving Hassell to the east, NC 142 terminates after  with the NC 125/NC 903 junction. The Tar Heel Trace continues southbound on NC 125.

History
The route was created in 1975 as part of a rerouting of NC 42, which formerly ran from the current NC 11/NC 42/NC 142 junction to the NC 125/NC 903 junction. In 1980 the route was expanded west to its current profile by promoting two secondary routes in Edgecombe and Martin County.

Junction list

References

142
Transportation in Edgecombe County, North Carolina
Transportation in Martin County, North Carolina